Ban Ahong, is a riverside village in northeastern Thailand on the banks of the Mekong. It is in tambon Khai Si in Bueng Kan Province. This stretch of the Mekong is narrow and deep and  naga fireballs were first reported here.

Sights and attractions
Wat Ahong Silawat Buddhist temple sits on the riverside near a large whirlpool ("navel of the Mekong"). The whirlpool is active during the rainy season from about June to September.

Transport
Ban Ahong is connected by Route 212 to both Nong Khai and Bueng Kan. Bus services to both towns use this road.

References

Populated places in Bueng Kan province
Populated places on the Mekong River